Chi Serpentis (χ Ser, χ Serpentis) is a solitary star in the Serpens Caput section of the equatorial constellation Serpens. Based upon an annual parallax shift of 14.84 mas as seen from Earth, it is located around 222 light years from the Sun. The star is bright enough to be faintly visible to the naked eye, having an apparent visual magnitude of +5.30.

In 1966 it was listed as a suspected spectroscopic binary, but it is believed to be single. The star has 2.11 times the mass of the Sun and about 1.9 times the Sun's radius. It is radiating 26 times the solar luminosity from its photosphere at an effective temperature of 9,557 K. At the age of 212 million years, it is spinning with a rotation period of 1.6 days.

Chi Serpentis is classified as an Alpha2 Canum Venaticorum type variable star, and its magnitude varies by 0.03 with a period of 1.5948 days. The pattern of variation in the spectrum suggest there are regions of enhanced strontium, chromium, iron, titanium, and magnesium on the surface of the star.

References

A-type main-sequence stars
Alpha2 Canum Venaticorum variables
Serpens (constellation)
Serpentis, Chi
Serpentis, 20
140160
076866
5843
Durchmusterung objects